The Hundred Pound Window is a 1944 British crime film directed by Brian Desmond Hurst and starring Anne Crawford, David Farrar, Frederick Leister and Richard Attenborough. The film follows an accountant who has to take a second job working at a racetrack, where he soon becomes mixed up with a shady crowd.

It was shot at Teddington Studios, the home of Warner Brothers's British subsidiary.

Cast
 Anne Crawford as Joan Draper
 David Farrar as George Graham
 Frederick Leister as Ernest Draper
 Mary Clare as Millie Draper
 Richard Attenborough as Tommy Draper
 Niall MacGinnis as Chick Slater
 David Hutcheson as Steve Halligan
 Claud Allister as Hon. Freddie
 Claude Bailey as John D. Humphries
 Hazel Bray as Cabaret Singer
 Peter Gawthorne as Van Rayden
 Anthony Hawtrey as Evans
 David Horne as Baldwin
 Francis Lister as Capt. Johnson
 Ruby Miller as Mrs. Remington
 Brefni O'Rorke as Kennedy
 John Salew as Walker
 John Slater as O'Neil
 C. Denier Warren as Blodgett

References

Bibliography
Castell, David. Richard Attenborough: A Pictorial Film Biography. Bodley Head, 1984.

External links

1944 films
1944 crime films
1940s English-language films
Films directed by Brian Desmond Hurst
British black-and-white films
British crime films
Films set in London
Films shot at Teddington Studios
Warner Bros. films
Films about gambling
British horse racing films
1940s British films